Liu Zhongsheng (born 1973-10-25 in Laiwu, Shandong) is a male Chinese sports shooter. He competed for Team China at the 2008 Summer Olympics.

Major performances
1995 National Intercity Games - 1st rapid-fire pistol;
2006 World Cup Germany/Italy - 3rd rapid-fire pistol;
2006 World Championships - 1st team/2nd individual rapid-fire pistol;
2006 Asian Games - 1st rapid-fire pistol individual/team;
2007 Asian Championships - 1st standard pistol

Records

2006 National Championships - 788.3, rapid-fire pistol team (NR)
2006 World Championships - 1743, rapid-fire pistol team (WR)

References
 http://2008teamchina.olympic.cn/index.php/personview/personsen/4924

1973 births
Living people
ISSF pistol shooters
Olympic shooters of China
People from Laiwu
Shooters at the 2008 Summer Olympics
Sport shooters from Shandong
Shooters at the 2006 Asian Games
Chinese male sport shooters
Asian Games medalists in shooting
Asian Games gold medalists for China
Asian Games bronze medalists for China
Medalists at the 2006 Asian Games
Sportspeople from Jinan